Jahrom University is a public university in Jahrom, Fars Province, Iran. This university is depended to the Ministry of Science, Research and Technology (the government ministry of science, research and technology in Iran).  In 1973, Jahrom University had first started its activities as an adjunct university in the form of Faculty of Basic Sciences for Shiraz University. This university then started its activities separately as a public university in 2006. The current president of the university is Dr. Kambiz Minaei.

The university offers undergraduate and graduate programs in a variety of disciplines.

Faculties 
Today the university has the following faculties:

1-     Faculty of Basic Sciences

2-     Faculty of Engineering and Technology

3-     Faculty of Agriculture

4-     Faculty of Literature and Humanities

See also 
 Jahrom University of Medical Sciences
 Islamic Azad University, Jahrom Branch

References 

Persian Wikipedia

Education in Jahrom
Buildings and structures in Jahrom
Universities in Iran
1973 establishments in Iran
Educational institutions established in 1973